Voskhod is the name of several types of motorcycles produced at the Degtyaryov Plant in the Russian town of Kovrov since 1965.

All Voskhod motorcycles had a single-cylinder two-stroke engine with a displacement of 175 cm³.

Between 1973 and 1979 Voskhod was one of the makes marketed by SATRA in the United Kingdom  as Cossack motorcycles. 

The Voskhod was introduced in 1957. For many this was a luxury model of the Minsk (125cc) K-55. In 1964 the Voskhod was made in a racing version.

In popular culture
In Ken Follett's The Edge of Eternity – The Century Trilogy 3, this is the motorcycle owned by character Dmitri Dvorkijn (Dimka). Early on in the book, Dmitri rides it when he is saving his sister Tanja in 1961. The Voskhod is presented here as a motorcycle for the privileged.

Sources

Degtyarev Plant products
Motorcycles of the Soviet Union
Motorcycles introduced in the 1960s
Soviet brands
Motorcycles of Russia
Two-stroke motorcycles